The 2014–15 Leinster Senior Cup, was the 114th staging of the Leinster Senior Cup association football competition. It was won by Dundalk.

Fourth round

Quarter-final

Semi-final

Final

The final was played at Oriel Park on October 26, 2015.

References

2015
2015 in Republic of Ireland association football cups